Panicum flexile, commonly called wiry panicgrass, is a species of flowering plant in the grass family (Poaceae). It is primarily native to eastern to North America, where it has a scattered and localized distribution. It is typically found in mafic or calcareous open areas, both wet and dry, particularly associated with limestone.

Panicum flexile is a rather delicate annual grass. It can be distinguished from similar-looking Panicum by its long-acuminate spikelets arranged in a slender, elongated panicle.

References

flexile
Flora of North America